Phaeopterula is a genus of fungi in the family Pterulaceae. Basidiocarps are clavarioid and resemble species of Pterula.

Taxonomy 
This genus was originally described by the German mycologist Paul Christoph Hennings in 1905 but most subsequent mycologists considered it a synonym of Pterula. The genus was resurrected in 2020 when a major reclassification of the Pterulaceae based on phylogenetic analysis split the family into four genera: Pterula, Myrmecopterula, Pterulicium, and Phaeopterula. Three former Pterula species were added to Phaeopterula.

Species 
As of October 2022, Species Fungorum accepted five species of Phaeopterula.

References 

Pterulaceae
Agaricales genera
Taxa described in 1905
Taxa named by Paul Christoph Hennings